Plumstead is a village and a civil parish in the English county of Norfolk. The nearest railway station is in the town of Sheringham where access to the national rail network can be made via the Bittern Line to Norwich. The nearest airport is Norwich International Airport. Plumstead falls within the area covered by North Norfolk District Council.

(Plumstead should not be confused with the Norfolk villages of Great Plumstead and Little Plumstead which are located close to each other, about 12 miles away, to the north-east of Norwich).

History
The villages name means 'Plum-tree place'.

Plumstead has an entry in the Domesday Book of 1085. In the great book Plumstead is recorded by the names Plumestead. The main landholder was William de Warenne.

Saint Michael parish church
The Grade II* listed parish church of Saint Michael was once much larger than it is today. On the south side of the building the low aisle has been demolished, and the clerestory filled in. The church's most notable feature is its collection of medieval and continental glass brought here from Catton Hall, near Norwich, in the 1950s.

References

http://kepn.nottingham.ac.uk/map/place/Norfolk/Plumstead

External links

Villages in Norfolk
Civil parishes in Norfolk
North Norfolk